K. J. Henry (born January 27, 1999) is an American football defensive end who currently plays for the Clemson Tigers.

Early life and high school
Henry grew up in Winston-Salem, North Carolina and attended West Forsyth High School. As a senior, he has 24 tackles for loss, 12 sacks, and 14 passes deflected. Henry was rated a five-star recruit and committed to play college football at Clemson after considering offers from Alabama and Clemson.

College career
Henry played in four games during his true freshman season at Clemson before redshirting the season. He played in all 15 of the Tigers' games as a redshirt freshman and made 22 tackles with 4.5 tackles for loss and two sacks. As a redshirt junior, Henry had 28 tackles, 6.5 tackles for loss, 4.5 sacks, one forced fumble, and a fumble recovery. He considered entering the 2022 NFL Draft, but opted to return to Clemson for a fifth season.

References

External links
 Clemson Tigers bio

Living people
American football defensive ends
Players of American football from North Carolina
Clemson Tigers football players
1999 births